Ambophthalmos is a genus of marine ray+finned fish belonging to the family Psychrolutidae. These fishes are found in the southwestern Pacific Ocean.

Species
There are currently three recognized species in this genus:
 Ambophthalmos angustus (J. S. Nelson, 1977) (Pale toadfish)
 Ambophthalmos eurystigmatephoros K. L. Jackson & J. S. Nelson, 1999
 Ambophthalmos magnicirrus (J. S. Nelson, 1977) (Frilled toadfish)

References

Psychrolutidae